Georgette Gagneux (17 June 1907 – 1 April 1931) was a French sprint runner who competed at the 1928 Olympics. She was eliminated in a semifinal of the 100 m event and finished fourth in the 4 × 100 m relay.

Biography 

Running for club Linnet's Saint-Maur, she won six French national track titles: two in the 80 metres,
three in the Long Jump and one in the Shot Put.

1923 she participated in the third Women’s Olympiad in Monte Carlo winning brons in the sprint 60 metres event.

She participated in the 1928 Olympic Games at Amsterdam. A semi-finalist in the 
100 m, she placed fourth in the 4 x 100 metres relay (alongside
Yolande Plancke, Marguerite Radideau and Lucienne Velu).

On 15 July 1928 at Paris, she established a new world record in the 4 x 100 metres relay alongside her teammates from
Linnet's Saint-Maur: Lucienne Velu, Simone Warnier et Marguerite Radideau, in the time of 50 seconds.

She also held the French national record in the Shot Put, Long Jump, 
100m and also the 4 x 100m relay.

Elle died on 1 April 1931 at Chamonix at the age of 23.

International

National 
 French National Athletic Championships :
 Gold medal in 80 metres in 1923 and 1929
 Gold medal in Long Jump in 1925, 1928 et 1929
 Gold medal in Shot Put 1929

Records

References

External References
 Picture Of Georgette Gagneux doing High Jump (Bibliothèque nationale de France – BnF)

1907 births
1931 deaths
People from Étampes
Athletes (track and field) at the 1928 Summer Olympics
Olympic athletes of France
French female sprinters
French female long jumpers
French female shot putters
Sportspeople from Essonne
Women's World Games medalists
20th-century French women